Advances in Life Course Research is a quarterly peer-reviewed interdisciplinary scientific journal covering the field of life course research. It was established in 2000 and is published by Elsevier. The editors-in-chief are L. Bernardi (University of Lausanne) and Juho Härkönen (European University Institute). According to the Journal Citation Reports, the journal has a 2021 impact factor of 5.548.

References

External links

Publications established in 2000
English-language journals
Multidisciplinary social science journals
Elsevier academic journals
Quarterly journals